Fitchia aptera is a species of assassin bug in the family Reduviidae. It is found in North America.

References

 Maldonado Capriles, Jenaro (1990). Systematic Catalogue of the Reduviidae of the World, x + 694.
 Thomas J. Henry, Richard C. Froeschner. (1988). Catalog of the Heteroptera, True Bugs of Canada and the Continental United States. Brill Academic Publishers.

Further reading

 

Reduviidae
Insects described in 1859